The East Lothian flag is the flag of the Scottish county of East Lothian (Haddingtonshire). It was registered with the Flag Institute on 13 December 2018 following its announcement at a reception hosted by the Lord Provost.

Design
This saltire design on blue reflects the local birthplace of the national flag, with the cross in gold signifying the wealth of the county's farmlands and reputation as the granary of Scotland. The lion rampant is a traditional emblem of the county – it appears in many local coats of arms while King William the Lion was born in the royal palace in Haddington. The blue stripes through the gold represent the rivers Esk and Tyne.

Competition
Run jointly by East Lothian Council and the Scottish Flag Trust, in association with the Lord Lyon and the East Lothian Courier, the competition was open to anyone. More than 620 entries were received from across the county, elsewhere in the UK and even as far afield as the United States and New Zealand. The judging panel comprised the Lord Lieutenant of East Lothian; the Lord Lyon; the Provost and chief executive of East Lothian Council; the chairman of the Scottish Flag Trust; and the editor of the East Lothian Courier. Four flag designs were shortlisted for the public vote, with the winning design announced on 13 December 2018.

See also
 List of Scottish flags
 List of British flags

References

External links
[ Flag Institute – East Lothian]

East Lothain
Flag
East Lothian
East Lothian
East Lothian